Witalis Ludwiczak (April 20, 1910 – June 17, 1988) was a Polish lawyer specializing in civil law and private international law, professor ordinarius of Adam Mickiewicz University as well as ice hockey player who competed in 1932 and 1936 Winter Olympics.

Graduate of Saint Mary Magdalene Gymnasium in Poznań (1929) and Faculty of Law and Economics at University of Poznań (1935) where he got his Master of Jurisprudence degree. He received a Doctor of Juridical Science degree in 1946. He began his career as a Professor of Civil Law at the AMU Faculty of Law and Administration, where he became a professor ordinarius (1969).

In 1932 he was a member of the Polish ice hockey team which finished fourth in the Olympic tournament. He played all six matches. Four years later he participated with the Polish team in the 1936 Olympic tournament. He played all three matches.

He fought in the September Campaign of World War II and was later interned by Nazis in Oflag II-C.

External links
 profile 

1910 births
1988 deaths
Olympic ice hockey players of Poland
Ice hockey players at the 1932 Winter Olympics
Ice hockey players at the 1936 Winter Olympics
Polish military personnel of World War II
Polish prisoners of war in World War II
World War II prisoners of war held by Germany
Sportspeople from Poznań
Prisoners of Oflag II-C